The Flaming Sword is a 1958 British film.

Cast
Geoffrey Black as Gordie
Reg Lye as Poggy
Douglas McLand as Blind John
Terence Morgan as Captain
Chips Rafferty as Long Tom
Laird Stuart as Timmy
Frank Thring as Gar

Reception
The film was a box office failure.

References

External links

1958 films
British drama films
1950s English-language films
1950s British films